Strikeforce: Los Angeles, was a mixed martial arts event held by Strikeforce. The event took place on June 16, 2010, at Nokia Theatre in Los Angeles, California.

Background
The card took place on a Wednesday and coincided with the 2010 Electronic Entertainment Expo (E3).

According to Strikeforce CEO Scott Coker, “The June 16 card will include some top-heavy main-event fighters, as well as some standout ‘Challenger’ prospects.”

Jason Miller was targeted as Robbie Lawler's opponent for this event. However, Strikeforce officials believe the Tennessee Athletic Commission will have Miller suspended, so Renato Sobral ended up being Lawler's opponent in a 195-lb Catchweight bout.

Bobby Lashley was set to face Ron Sparks on this card, however, Lashley dropped out after injuring his knee in training.

Charles Bennett was set to have a rematch against K. J. Noons but Bennett was forced to pull out for an undisclosed reason. He was replaced by Conor Heun.

Strikeforce CEO Scott Coker confirmed in an interview on June 9, 2010, that the winner of the Robbie Lawler vs. Renato Sobral fight would get a title shot in their respective division. Sobral would fight Muhammed Lawal, or Lawler would fight Jake Shields, though he was later replaced by Ronaldo Souza in the proposed matchup after Shields signed with the UFC. After winning the fight, Sobral announced that he wouldn't fight Lawal due to their friendship, and instead challenged Dan Henderson, who would defeat Sobral at Strikeforce: St. Louis on December 4, 2010, by TKO. The light heavyweight title shot would instead go to Rafael Cavalcante, who beat Lawal by TKO for the title at Strikeforce: Houston on August 21, 2010.

Strikeforce Challengers announcers Stephen Quadros and Pat Miletich handled commentary duties alongside Mauro Ranallo for this event, in lieu of the absent Gus Johnson & Frank Shamrock.

The event drew an estimated 164,000 viewers, with a peak at 197,000 on Showtime.

Results

Reported payout

The following is a list of fighter salaries as provided by the California State Athletic Commission. The figures do not include deductions for items such as insurance, licenses and taxes. Additionally, the figures do not include money paid by sponsors, which can often be a substantial portion of a fighter's income.

Renato "Babalu" Sobral: $100,000 (no win bonus) def. Robbie Lawler: $85,000
Evangelista "Cyborg" Santos: $10,000 (no win bonus) def. Marius Zaramoskis: $5,000
Tim Kennedy: $30,000 (no win bonus) def. Trevor Prangley: $30,000
K. J. Noons: $25,000 (no win bonus) def. Conor Heun: $4,000
Jeremy Umphries: $1,500 (no win bonus) def. R.J. Clifford: $2000
Hugo Sandoval: $1,500 (no win bonus) def. Marcus Kowal: $1,000

References

See also
 Strikeforce (mixed martial arts)
 List of Strikeforce champions
 List of Strikeforce events
 2010 in Strikeforce

Los Angeles
2010 in mixed martial arts
Mixed martial arts in Los Angeles
2010 in sports in California